In Greek mythology, the Charites , singular Charis, or Graces, were three or more goddesses of charm, beauty, nature, human creativity, goodwill, and fertility. Hesiod names three – Aglaea ("Shining"), Euphrosyne ("Joy"), and Thalia ("Blooming") – and names Aglaea as the youngest and the wife of Hephaestus. Some sources use the appellation "Charis" as the name of one of the Charites, and equate her with Aglaea, as she too is referred to as the wife of Hephaestus.

The Charites were usually considered the daughters of Zeus and Oceanid Eurynome. Rarely, they were said to be daughters of Dionysus and Coronis or of Helios and the Naiad Aegle or of Hera by an unnamed father. Other possible names of their mother by Zeus are Eurydome, Eurymedousa, or Euanthe. Homer identified them as part of the retinue of Aphrodite. The Charites were also associated with the Greek underworld and the Eleusinian Mysteries.

In post-classical painting and sculpture, the three Charites are often depicted naked or almost naked, but during the Archaic and Classical periods of Greece, they were typically depicted as fully clothed.

Mythology

Members of the Charites 
The name and number of goddesses associated with the Charites varied, although they usually numbered three. Alternate names to Aglaea, Euphrosyne, and Thalia given in literature included: Damia ("Earth Mother"), Auxesia ("Spring Growth"), Cleta ("Renowned"), Phaenna ("Bright"), Hegemone ("Leader"), Peitho ("Persuasion"), Paregoros ("Consolation"), Pasithea ("Relaxation"), Charis ("Grace"), and Kale ("Beauty"). Alternatively, an ancient vase painting attests the following names as: Antheia ("Blossoms"), Eudaimonia ("Happiness"), Euthymia ("Good Mood"), Eutychia ("Good Luck"), Paidia ("Play"), Pandaisia ("Banquet"), and Pannychis ("Night Festivities"), all refer to the Charites as patronesses of amusement and festivities.

Pausanias interrupts his Description of Greece (Book 9.35.1–7) to expand upon the various conceptions of the Charites that developed in different parts of mainland Greece and Ionia:

Nonnus gives their three names as Pasithea, Peitho and Aglaia. Sostratus gives the names as Pasithea, Cale ("Beauty") and Euphrosyne; Pasithea for Thalia and Cale for Aglaia, Euphrosyne is unchanged. In Sparta, only Cleta and Phaenna were counted.

Role in mythology 
The Charites' major mythological role was to attend the other Olympians, particularly during feasts and dances. They attended Aphrodite by bathing and anointing her in Paphos before her seduction of Ankhises and after she left Olympus when her affair with Ares is found out. Additionally, they are said to weave or dye her peplos. Along with Peitho, they presented Pandora with necklaces to make her more enticing. Pindar stated the Charites arranged feasts and dances for the Olympians. They also danced in celebration of the birth of Apollo with Aphrodite, Hebe, and Harmonia. They were often referenced as dancing and singing with Apollo and the Muses. Pindar also referred to them as the guardians of the ancient Minyans and the queens of Orchomenus who have their thrones beside Apollo's.

The Charites appear to have a connection to Hera, where some ancient authors reference her as their nurse. In the Iliad, as part of her plan to seduce Zeus to distract him from the Trojan War, she offers to arrange Hypnos's marriage to Pasithea, who is referred to as one of the younger Charites.

Aglaea or Charis had a role as the wife of the smith god Hephaestus. In the Iliad, Aglaea invites Thetis into their shared home on Olympus so that the latter may ask for Hephaestus to forge armor for her son Achilles. Some scholars have interpreted this marriage as occurring after Hephaestus's divorce from Aphrodite due to her affair with Ares being exposed. Notably, however, some scholars, such as Walter Burkert, support that the marriage of Hephaestus and Aphrodite as an invention of the Odyssey, since it is not represented within other Archaic or Classical era literature or arts, and it does not appear to have a connection to cult.

Cult 

The cult of the Charites is very old, with their name appearing to be of Pelasgian, or pre-Greek, origin rather than being brought to Greece by Proto-Indo-Europeans. The purpose of their cult appears to be similar to that of nymphs, primary based around fertility and nature with a particular connection to springs and rivers. One of the earliest centres of worship for the Charites was the Cycladic Islands including Paros, with epigraphical evidence for a cult to the Charites dating to the sixth century B.C.E. on the island of Thera. Scholars have interpreted them as chthonic deities connected to fertility due to the absence of wreaths and flutes in ceremonies. An aetiological explanation for the lack of music and garlands was from a myth involving Minos. He was said to have been sacrificing to the Charites on the island of Paros when he learned of his son's death in Athens and stopped the music and ripped off his garlands in grief. Dance, however, appears to be strongly connected with their cult, which is similar to the cults of Dionysus and Artemis.

Although the Charites were most commonly depicted in the sanctuaries of other gods, there were at least four temples exclusively dedicated to them in Greece. The temple regarded as their perhaps most important was that in Orkhomenos in Boeotia, where their cult was thought to have originated. There were also temples to the Charites in Hermione, Sparta, and Elis. A temple was dedicated to the Charites near the Tiasa river in Amyclae, Laconia that was reportedly founded by the ancient King of Sparta, Lacedaemon.

In Orkhomenos, the goddesses were worshipped at a very ancient site with a trio of stones, which is similar to other Boiotian cults to Eros and Herakles. The local river Kephisos and the Akidalia (or Argaphia) spring was sacred to the three goddesses. Orkhomenos was an agriculturally prosperous city because of the marshy Kopaic plain, and the Charites were offered a portion of the produce. Regarding the foundation of their cult in Orkhomenos, Strabo wrote:

In cult, the Charites were particularly connected with Apollo and appear to be connect to his cult on Delos, however, this connection is not present in other cults to Apollo. In the Classical era and beyond, the Charites were associated with Aphrodite in connection to civic matters.

There was a festival in honour of the Charites which was called Charisia (Χαρίσια). During this festival there were dances all night and at the end a cake was given to those who remained awake during the whole time.

Visual art
Despite the Charites often being depicted naked entwined in an embrace, this appears to be a later development, as in depictions from Archaic and Classical Greece, they are finely dressed. In contrast, third century B.C.E. poets Callimachus and Euphorion describe the trio as being nude.

The earliest representation of these goddesses was found in a temple of Apollo in Thermon dated to the seventh to sixth century B.C.E. It is possible, however, that the Charites are represented on a Mycenean golden seal ring that depicts two female figures dancing in the presence of a male figure, who has been interpreted as Hermes or Dionysus. Another early representation of the Charites, from a relief at the Paros colony of Thasos dated to the beginning of the fifth century B.C.E., shows the Charites with Hermes and either Aphrodite or Peitho, which marked the entrance to the old city. The opposite side of the relief shows Apollo being crowned by Artemis with nymphs in the background. At the entrance of the Akropolis, there was a famous Classical era relief of the Charities and Hermes, and the popular belief was that the sculptor was Sokrates, although this is very unlikely.

One of the earliest known Roman representations of the Graces was a wall painting in Boscoreale dated to 40 B.C.E, which also depicted Aphrodite with Eros and Dionysus with Ariadne. The group may have also appeared on a small number of coins to symbolize the union between Marcus Aurelius and Faustina Minor and on other coins they were depicted in the hands of Juno or Venus. The Graces were common subject matter on Roman sarcophagi, and they were depicted on several mirrors.

On the representation of the Graces, second century C.E. geographer Pausanias wrote:

During the Renaissance, the Roman statue group of the three graces in the Piccolomini library in Duomo di Siena inspired most themes.

The Charites are depicted together with several other mythological figures in Sandro Botticelli's painting Primavera. Raphael also pictured them in a painting now housed in Chantilly in France. Among other artistic depictions, they are the subject of famous sculptures by Antonio Canova and Bertel Thorvaldsen.

A group of three trees in the Calaveras Big Trees State Park are named "The Three Graces" after the Charites.

List of notable artworks with images resembling the three Charites 

 Anonymous
 Anonymous
Jean Arp (16 September 18867 June 1966) The Three Graces (1961)
Francesco Bartolozzi
Jacques Blanchard (1631–33) Man surprising Sleeping Venus and Graces
Giulio di Antonio Bonasone
Sandro Botticelli (1482); detail of Primavera;
Marie Bracquemond (1880) Trois femmes aux ombrelles 
Antonio Canova (1799) The Three Graces
Agostino Carracci
Paul Cézanne
Antonio da Correggio (1518);
Francesco del Cossa, Allegory of April, Palazzo Schifanoia, School of Ferrara.
 Maurice Raphael Drouart
Ewen Feuillâtre The Three Graces : Aglaea, Euphrosyne & Thalia (2020)
 Hans Baldung Grien (1540)
 Ludwig Von Hofmann
Laura Knight
Jean-Baptiste van Loo (1684–1745) at the Château de Chenonceau
Ambrogio Lorenzetti (1348–50) Allegory of Good Government
Jacob Matham
Arthur Frank Mathews
Bruce Peebles & Co. advertisement (c. 1900)
Pablo Picasso The Three Graces (1925)
Germain Pilon
Jacopo Pontormo (1535)
James Pradier (1831) Les Trois Grâces
Jean-Baptiste Regnault Les Trois Grâces (1797–1798)
Peter Paul Rubens
 Raphael Sanzio
Anna Soghomonyan, Three Graces (2020)
Cosimo Tura (1476–84) detail of Allegory of April
 Unknown artist, The Three Graces sculpture in Indianapolis
Kehinde Wiley Three Graces
Joel-Peter Witkin

See also

 627 Charis
 Charisma
 Charis (name)
 Grâces
 Three of Cups Tarot

References
(The Imagebase links are all broken)

Bibliography

 Colluthus, The Rape of Helen in Oppian, Colluthus, Tryphiodorus, translated by A. W. Mair, Loeb Classical Library No. 219, Cambridge, Massachusetts, Harvard University Press, 1928. . Online version at Harvard University Press.
 Fisher, Nick, "Kharis, Kharites, festivals, and social peace in the classical Greek city," in Ralph M. Rosen and Ineke Sluiter (Eds), Valuing Others in Classical Antiquity (Leiden, Brill, 2010) (Mnemosyne Supplements, 323),
 Grimal, Pierre, The Dictionary of Classical Mythology, Wiley-Blackwell, 1996, . "Charites" p. 99
 Smith, William; Dictionary of Greek and Roman Biography and Mythology, London (1873). "Charis"

External links

 The Theoi Project, "THE KHARITES" 
 The charites — Judgement of Paris — art article (Spanish)
 Warburg Institute Iconographic Database (ca 300 images of the Charites) 

Arts goddesses
Fertility goddesses
Greek goddesses
Nature goddesses
Children of Zeus
Triple goddesses
Beauty goddesses
Children of Helios
Children of Dionysus
Children of Hera
Olympian deities

sl:Harite